Djilma Airfield is an abandoned military airfield in Tunisia, located about 2 km north of Jilma (Sidi Bu Zayd); approximately 180 km west-southwest of Tunis.

The airfield was built during World War II as a temporary field which was used by the United States Army Air Force Twelfth Air Force 31st Fighter Group during the North African Campaign against the German Afrika Korps.

The 31st Fighter Group based three squadrons (307th, 308th, 309th) of Supermarine Spitfires at the airfield from 7 to 12 April 1943.   It then moved to Korba Airfield and afterwards, engineers came to the field and dismantled the facility.

Today there are little or no remains of the airfield, except the remains of a runway in the desert just north of the town of Jilma,  visible from satellite imagery.

References

 Maurer, Maurer. Air Force Combat Units of World War II. Maxwell AFB, Alabama: Office of Air Force History, 1983. .

Airfields of the United States Army Air Forces in Tunisia
World War II airfields in the United States
Airports established in 1942
1942 establishments in Tunisia